ODI may refer to:

 Object Design, Incorporated, a defunct database software company
 One Day International, cricket match
 Open Data Institute, a UK not-for-profit company promoting open data
 Open Data-Link Interface, an implementation of the OSI model data link layer
 Oracle Data Integrator, software used in data transformation
 Oral direct inhibitor, a type of anticoagulant
 Oswestry Disability Index, a questionnaire for rating the severity of back pain 
 Outcome-Driven Innovation
 Outward direct investment; see Internationalization of the renminbi
 Overseas Development Institute, a UK think tank on international development

Odi may refer to:
 Odi massacre, a military attack on the town of Odi, Nigeria
 Odi Stadium, a stadium in South Africa

See also
 Odis (disambiguation)